Jose Parica (born April 18, 1949) is a Filipino professional pool player from Manila, nicknamed "Amang" (English: "Father") and "the Giant Killer."  As a Filipino Hall of Famer, he pioneered the "Filipino invasion" in the United States in the late 70s, especially in the game of Nine-ball. Also known as "the King" in the Philippines, Parica is considered one of the greatest money players of all time. He became the Billiards Digest Player of the Year in 1997. He scored a perfect match with no mistakes in 9-ball race to 11 format in 1997 at the PBT Legends of Nine-ball.

Career
In 1976, Parica, hoping to get a better deal for Filipino billiard players, organized the Philippine Pocket Billiards Association and became its first president. The same year he was invited to the All Japan Championship and finished second in the Rotation division to Tetsuro Kakuto. In 1978, he was invited to his first tournament in the United States, the World Straight Pool Championship were he placed 11th. He was the first Filipino to travel to the United States. Shortly after, in 1979, Parica travelled back to the Philippines and became the National 3-Cushion, Rotation, and Snooker Champion.

Filipino player Efren Reyes joined Parica in 1985, in the start of what is now known as the "Filipino invasion". In 1982, Parica won the Playboy All-Around Classic, with the victory, Parica became the first male Asian player to win a professional pool event in the United States. In 1986, Parica won the Clyde Childress Memorial 9-Ball Open, followed up with a victory in the Classic Cup V title. 

Parica had won over 100 international tournaments, including titles in the United States, the Philippines and Japan. In 1988, Parica participated in the Japanese circuit, winning the All Japan Championship in 9-Ball. That same year in Japan, he won the JPPA World 9-Ball Championship, sanctioned by the Japan Pool Players Association, which hosted the largest tournament at the time, with 900 players participating, which was a record number of participants in a tournament at the time. Parica beat Efren Reyes 9–3 in the finals, earning the first prize of $39,000 for his victory. This made Parica the first male Asian player to win a world championship in pocket billiards.

In 1994, Parica married his wife Aurora and became less active on the Professional Billiards Tour. In 1996, Parica resumed playing full time and won four tournaments that year, Beating rival Efren Reyes three times in the finals. In 1997, Parica won five tournaments and was ranked number 1 on the professional tour rankings as well as winning the Camel tour overall bonus of $50,000 defeating Buddy Hall. He was chosen Player of the Year in 1997 by the Billiards Digest Magazine.

Allegations of crime
In the early 1990s, Parica attacked a man who he said was troubling his wife. The battered man had a different story, stating that Parica robbed him of his belongings. Parica was imprisoned for one day. After paying fines and testifying in court, Parica won the case and was released.

Hall of Fame
Many fans and pundits of the game believed that Parica should have been inducted in to the Billiard Congress of America Hall of Fame long before his induction. Parica played professionally in to his 60s to further earn the recognition for his induction, that many people believed he already deserved. In 2014, Parica was inducted into the Billiard Congress of America Hall of Fame, at the age of 65.

Career titles & achievements

References

External links

Industry profile of Parica
Another industry profile of parica
Fansite profile of Parica
Another fansite profile of Parica

Filipino pool players
1949 births
Living people
Place of birth missing (living people)
People from La Puente, California